Rodney Whitaker (born February 22, 1968) is an American jazz double bass player and educator.

Biography
Born in Detroit, Whitaker attended Wayne State University, and studied with Robert Gladstone, principal bass with the Detroit Symphony Orchestra, and trumpeter Marcus Belgrave.

He achieved recognition performing with Terence Blanchard's Quintet and then with Roy Hargrove. His own first album Children of the Light was released in 1996.

His score for the film China, directed by Jeff Wray, was released on PBS in 2002.

In 2006, Whitaker was nominated for the Juno Award Traditional Jazz Album of the Year for Let Me Tell You About My Day, his album in collaboration with Phil Dwyer and Alan Jones. He has also been working with the pianist Junko Onishi.

Whitaker is professor of jazz double bass and director of jazz studies at Michigan State University's College of Music. He has presented master classes at such institutions as Duke University, Howard University, University of Iowa, University of Michigan, the New School (NY), Lincoln Center, and the Detroit International Jazz Festival, and at the conferences of the International Association for Jazz Education (IAJE). He has also worked with Detroit Symphony Orchestra to develop a jazz education department, and conducts their Civic Jazz Orchestra, as well as being on the faculties of University of Michigan and Juilliard School.

Discography

As leader
Outrospection: The Music of Gregg Hill (Origin Records, 2021)
Cranbrook Christmas Jazz (Origin Records, 2021)
Common Ground: The Music of Gregg Hill (Origin Records, 2019) with Terrell Stafford, Tim Warfield, Bruce Barth, Dana Hall, Rockelle Fortin
All Too Soon: The Music of Duke Ellington (Origin Records, 2019)
When We Find Ourselves Alone (Mack Avenue, 2014)
Children of the Light (DIW, 1995) with Nicholas Payton, Wallace Roney
 Hidden Kingdom (DIW, 1997) with Carter, Ron Blake, Gerald Cleaver
 The Brooklyn Session: Ballads and Blues (Criss Cross, 1998) with Wycliffe Gordon, Stefon Harris
 Yesterday Today and Tomorrow (Sirocco Jazz, 1999) with Wynton Marsalis, Wycliffe Gordon, Dianne Reeves
 Get Ready (Mack Avenue, 2007) with Carl Allen
 Work to Do (Mack Avenue, 2008) with Carl Allen
 When We Find Ourselves Alone (Mack Avenue, 2014)
Common Ground: The Music of Gregg Hill (Origin Records, 2019)
All Too Soon: The Music of Duke Ellington (Origin Records, 2019)
Cranbrook Christmas Jazz (Origin Records, 2021) with The Christ Church Cranbrook Choir
Outrospection: The Music of Gregg Hill (Origin Records, 2021)
Oasis: The Music of Gregg Hill (Origin Records, 2022)

Collaborations 
 Live from the Detroit Jazz Festival – 2013 (Mack Avenue, 2014)

As sideman
 Mora, Francisco Mora, AACE, 1986
 Wait Broke the Wagon Down, Wendell Harrison, Wenha, 1986
 Terence Blanchard, Terence Blanchard/Branford Marsalis, Columbia, 1991
 Don't You Know I Care, Antonio Hart, RCA/Novus, 1991
 The Old & the New, Shawn "Thunder" Wallace, MiJaWa, 1991
 Simply Stated, Terence Blanchard, Columbia, 1992
 Of Kindred Souls w/ 4 Originals, Roy Hargrove, RCA/Novus, 1992
 A Portrait of You, Donald Walden, Jazz Works, 1992
 Vibe, Roy Hargrove, RCA/Novus, 1992
 It's All Right to Swing, Eric Reed/Wynton Marsalis, Mo Jazz, 1993
 Crusin', Junko Onishi, EMI, 1993
 Jmukai Quintet, Mukai, EMI, 1993
 True Blue, Mark Whitfield, Verve/Polygram, 1994
 Monk's Modern Music, Rick Roe, Unknown, 1994
 With the Tenors of Our Time, Roy Hargrove, Verve/Polygram, 1994
 Approaching Standards, Roy Hargrove, BMG/Novus, 1994
 Roy Hargrove & Friends, Roy Hargrove, Verve/Polygram, 1995
 The Swing & I, Eric Reed, Mo Jazz, 1995
 Chicago, New York, Paris, Johnny Griffin, Verve/Polygram, 1995
 Family, Roy Hargrove, Verve, 1995
 Piano Quintet Suite, Junko Onishi, Blue Note, 1995
 My Generation, Teodross Avery, Impulse, 1995
 Collage, Keith Saxton, Kevin Hole, 1996
 Pursuance–The Music of John Coltrane, Kenny Garrett, Warner Bros., 1996
 Kevin, Mahogany, Kevin Mahogany, Warner Bros., 1996
 A Grand Encounter, Dianne Reeves, Blue Note, 1996
 The Change Over, Rick Roe, Unknown, 1996
 Wholly Cat's, Russell Malone, 1996
 Live @ The Kerry Town Concert Hall, Phil Lasley, 1996
Kamau, Charles Sullivan, 1995
 Penn's Landing, Clarence Penn, Criss Cross, 1996
 Tenor Time, Joe Lovano, Blue Note, 1997
 Jackie Mac's Bag, Milan Simich, Hip Bop, 1997
 Collected Roy Hargrove, Roy Hargrove, Verve, 1998
 Collected Antonio Hart, Antonio Hart, Novus/BMG, 1998
 Foresight, Foresight, N2K, 1998
 Introducing Orin Evans, Orin Evans, Criss Cross, 1998
 Dennis Jeter, Dennis Jeter, Jeter Productions, 1998
 Francisco Mora, Francisco Mora, Community, 1998
 Captain Black, Orin Evans, Criss Cross, 1998
 Focusing the Vision, Vincent York, Vincent York, 1998
 Andrew Speight Quartet, Andrew Speight, ABC/EMI, 1998
 A Mingus & a Monk Among Us, Donald Walden, Jazz Works, 1998
 Bluestone, Joh Yamada, Alfa, 1999
 Slidin' Home, Wycliffe Gordon, Nagel/Heyer, 1999
 Live from Swing City, Lincoln Center Jazz Orchestra, Sony, 1999
 Big Train, Wynton Marsalis, Sony, 1999
 Marciac Suite, Wynton Marsalis, Sony, 1999Reflections in Change, Craig Handy, Sirocco Music, 1999
 Grown Fold Bizness, Orin Evans, Criss Cross, 1999
 To Those We Love So Dearly, Victor Goines, Rosemary Joseph, 1999
 Title Unknown–Soon To Be Released, Alex Graham, 1999
 Double Duke, Joe Temperely, Naxos, 1999
 The Search, Wycliffe Gordon, Nagel/Heyer, 1999
 Live @ Blue Note, Jaz Sawyer & Irvin Mayfield, Half Note, 2000
 Uptown Lowdown "A Salute to D" , Nagel/Heyer/All Stars, Nagel/Heyer, 2000
 Watch What You're Doin' , Herlin Riley, Criss Cross, 2000
 Sweet Release, Wynton Marsalis, Sony, 2000
 Reflections & Change, Craig Handy, Sirocco Jazz, 2000
 Flow, Craig Handy, Sirocco Jazz, 2000
 A Portrait of Kevin Mahogany, Kevin Mahogany, Warner Bros., 2000
 Hymn for Roscoe Mitchell, Stephen Rush Quartet, 2000
 Olive Tree, Walter Blanding, Criss Cross, 2000
 Yesterday, Today & Tomorrow, Rodney Whitaker, Sirrocco Jazz, 2001
 Play Penn, Clarence Penn Quintet, Criss Cross, 2001
 Introducing Peter Baits, Peter Baits, Criss Cross, 2001
 Introducing Milt Grayson, Milt Grayson, 2001
 All Rise, Wynton Marsalis, Sony, 2001
 Penns Landing, Clarence Penn–Criss Cross, 2003
 Dameronia–Donald Walden & The Detroit Jazz Orchestra–Jazz Works, 2003
 Louis Armstrong's Jazz Curriculum CD Series–LCJO–Warner Bros., 2003
 Introducing: Peter Baits – Peter Baits, Criss Cross, 2003
 We Got It – Matt Ray – Label Unknown, 2003
 E–Bop – Eric Reed – Savant, 2003
 Joyride – Wycliffe Gordon – Nagel/Heyer, 2003
 Flow – Craig Handy – Sirrocco Jazz, 2003
 Third Floor – Professors of Jazz @ MSU – MSU Jazz, 2003
 Freewheelin'  – Jazz Compilation – Arkadia, 2003
 Hip Bop Essence – All Star – Hip Bop, 2003
 Soul Trinity–Volume One – Frederick Sanders – FreSan, 2003
 Winter Moon–Rodney Whitaker–Sirocco Jazz Ltd., 2004
 Let Me Tell You About My Day – 2004 Alan Jones, 2004
 Unforgivable Blackness–DVD–Wynton Marsalis/Ken Burns, 2004
 Sphere–Rick Roe–Unknown Records, 2005
 The Good Life–Alex Graham–Origin, 2005
 Here–Eric Reed–Max Jazz, 2006
 Shades of Green–Ron DiSalvio w/Jimmy Cobb–Label N/A, 2006
 World Trade Music–Francisco Catlett–Mora–Label N/A, 2006
 Get Ready–Carl Allen/Rodney Whitaker–Mack Avenue, 2007
 Work to Do–Carl Allen/Rodney Whitaker–Mack Avenue, 2008
 Maureen Choi Quartet''–Maureen Choi Music, 2010

References

External links
Official Website
Rodney Whitaker Artist Page
Michigan State University entry

African-American jazz musicians
American jazz double-bassists
Male double-bassists
American jazz educators
American music educators
Post-bop double-bassists
1968 births
Living people
Jazz musicians from Michigan
Musicians from Detroit
Michigan State University faculty
Wayne State University alumni
DIW Records artists
21st-century double-bassists
21st-century American male musicians
American male jazz musicians
21st-century African-American musicians
20th-century African-American people
Criss Cross Jazz artists
Mack Avenue Records artists
Origin Records artists